Wiston House is a 16th-century Grade I listed building set in the South Downs National Park on the south coast of England, surrounded by over  of parkland in Wiston, West Sussex. It is the home of Wilton Park, an executive agency of the Foreign and Commonwealth Office.

Originally built in two storeys to an irregular floor plan, substantial parts of the house have since been demolished and replaced and additional wings added. It is a Grade I listed building.

History
The house was built for Thomas Shirley in about 1576 and substantially enlarged by Edward Blore in the early 19th century. It was captured first by the Royalists and then by the Parliamentarians during the English Civil War. It was bought by Sir John Fagg in 1649 and then acquired by Sir Charles Goring, the husband of Fagg's great-granddaughter, in 1743. During the Second World War, the grounds were used as a camp by the 10th battalion Highland Light Infantry as they prepared for the Normandy landings.

Since 1951 the house has been the base of Wilton Park, an executive agency of the Foreign and Commonwealth Office providing a global forum for strategic discussion.

Wiston House is still owned by the Goring family, who open the grounds every year to the Big Church Festival (previously known as the "Big Church Day Out").

The Church of St Mary
Close to the house is the Parish Church of St Mary, a Grade II* listed building. The church comprises a chancel, a south chapel, twin naves and a tower. Mainly dating from the 14th century, it was heavily restored by architect Gordon MacDonald Hills in 1862. The south chapel contains a brass dated 1426 to Sir John de Braose and the tombs of the Shirley family.

References

Country houses in West Sussex
Grade I listed buildings in West Sussex